This is a list of things named after Malala Yousafzai, a Pakistani peace activist and Nobel Prize laureate known for her advocacy for girls' education.

Awards 
 2011: the National Peace Award for Youth, a Pakistani award presented annually to children under the age of 18 in recognition of their "outstanding" contribution to any field such as education.

Science

Asteroids 
 2015: 316201 Malala, an asteroid discovered by a NASA astronomer, Amy Mainzer.

Shapes 
2017: British astronomers "selected a new set of shapes for constellations" and named it after her. The selected shapes represents stars from various fields such as sports, entertainment and politics. It also included an honorary book in recognition of Malala.

Documentaries 
 2015: He Named Me Malala an American documentary.
 2020: Gul Makai, Indian biographical drama film titled after her online pseudonym Gul Makai.

Places 
 2017: Malala Park, in Cubillos del Sil, Spain. It was originally proposed by the school authorities and named by 12 years old children at the International Women's Day event in 2015.
2018: Malala Village, in Rawalpindi District.
 2019: Malala Yousafzai Public School, in Peel District School Board, Ontario, Canada.
 2020: Malala Yousafzai Elementary School, in Fort Bend Independent School District, Texas, United States of America. After the elementary school was proposed, the district's board of trustees named it after the activist in 2018. The school officially opened in January 2020.

Law and education 
 2020: Malala Yousafzai Scholarship Act, originally proposed in 2014.

References 

Malala Yousafzai